Virgil Vargas Villavicencio is assistant manager of TNT Katropa in the Philippine Basketball Association and former assistant coach of Talk 'N Text's championship-winning team in the 2003 All-Filipino Cup. Villavicencio is also a former head coach of the La Salle Green Archers in the UAAP and led the team to consecutive runner-up finishes in 1994 and 1995.

Basketball career
Villavicencio played for the La Salle Green Archers in the collegiate ranks between 1972 and 1976, and was part of the 1974-75 NCAA championship-winning team, alongside former PBA legend Lim Eng Beng.

Coaching career
Villavicencio coached the Ateneo Blue Eaglets high school basketball team to five consecutive titles in the Metro Manila Basketball League (1989–1993) and four consecutive runner-up spots in the UAAP Juniors Division (1989–1992). In 1993, he was appointed head coach of the La Salle Green Archers, and in his first year guided the team to a third-place finish in a tournament dominated by the UST. In the next season, 1994-95, he led the team even closer to the title, as they won the first of a three-game Final series against UST, before losing the second game by 14 points and then the deciding game by a single point. He repeated this feat in the next season, as La Salle again beat UST in the first game of the Finals, only to lose the second game by four points and the third game by three points to finish runner-up for the second season running.

He coached the Philippines national basketball team at the 1994 SEABA Championship where the team which had Allen Patrimonio, Rensy Bajar, Gerard Francisco, Romel Adducul and Joel Villanueva among its roster finished fourth.

Alongside his collegiate coaching duties, Villavicencio was assistant coach of the Triple-V team in the Philippine Basketball League, helping them to championships in the 1991 and 1992 seasons.  In 1995, he coached the Philippine youth national basketball team at the 13th Asian Youth Basket Ball Championship.

After this, Villavicencio moved on to the Philippine Basketball Association, where he was assistant coach of Talk 'N Text (then known as the Phone Pals) as they won the 2003 All-Filipino Cup. The team continued to perform well, finishing third in the transitional 2004 conference and reaching the Finals of the 2004-05 Philippine Cup only to lose 4-2 to Barangay Ginebra Kings. Villavicencio left the coaching staff in 2005 but returned to Talk 'N Text as part of the management team in 2008. He was stepping down after winning many championships and replaced by Gabby Cui.

Coaching record

Collegiate record

References

External links
PBA.ph
PBL.org

Living people
Filipino men's basketball players
Filipino men's basketball coaches
Year of birth missing (living people)
Place of birth missing (living people)
De La Salle Green Archers basketball players
Philippines men's national basketball team coaches
TNT Tropang Giga coaches
De La Salle Green Archers basketball coaches